Most foreign nationals visiting Saint Vincent and the Grenadines are granted visa free access. However, certain countries must obtain a visa in advance before being allowed into the country.

Saint Vincent and the Grenadines signed a mutual visa-waiver agreement with the European Union on 28 May 2015 which was ratified on 15 December 2015. This agreement allows all citizens of states that are contracting parties to the Schengen Agreement to stay without a visa for a maximum period of 90 days in any 180-day period.

Visa policy map

Allowed stay
Freedom of movement

6 months
Nationals of the following countries and territories are visa exempt for stays up to 6 months:

3 months
Other foreign visitors are in general granted visa free access for stays up to 3 month, which can be extended for a fee.

Countries requiring visas
Citizens of the following 9 countries must obtain a visa prior to arrival. A fee of EC$200.00 is required to obtain the visa:

See also

Visa requirements for Saint Vincent and the Grenadines citizens

References 

Saint Vincent and the Grenadines
Foreign relations of Saint Vincent and the Grenadines
Government of Saint Vincent and the Grenadines